Mohamed Saleem Mohamed Aslam is a Sri Lankan politician and a member of the Parliament of Sri Lanka.

Aslam was appointed as the United National Front's National List MP in the Sri Lankan Parliament in April 2010.

Aslam is the treasurer of the Sri Lanka Muslim Congress.

References
 

Sri Lanka Muslim Congress politicians
Members of the 14th Parliament of Sri Lanka
Living people
Year of birth missing (living people)
Place of birth missing (living people)